Emry is both a surname and a given name. Notable people with the name include:

Elizabeth Emry (1923–1995), American baseball player
Shea Emry (born 1986), Canadian football player
Emry Arthur (1902–1967), American musician

See also
Emrys, a masculine Welsh given name
EMRY